Jarifa is a singer and composer of tsapiky music from the southern coastal area of Madagascar. He has released several albums in Madagascar and regularly gives concerts across the island. He achieved nationwide success with his single "Dango Dango" in 2004.

See also
Music of Madagascar

Notes

References
 

21st-century Malagasy male singers